The 2010 FIFA Club World Cup final was the final match of the 2010 FIFA Club World Cup, an association football tournament for the champion clubs from each of FIFA's six continental confederations. The match took place at the Sheikh Zayed Stadium, Abu Dhabi, on 18 December 2010, and pitted TP Mazembe of the Democratic Republic of the Congo, the CAF club champions, against Internazionale of Italy, the UEFA club champions. It was the first time that a club from outside Europe or South America was involved in contesting the final.

Inter won the final 3–0 over TP Mazembe. Goran Pandev and Samuel Eto'o scored two goals in the first half before Jonathan Biabiany scored the third goal in the 85th minute to secure the first title for Inter Milan.

Road to final

Match

Details

Statistics

See also
Inter Milan in European football

References

External links
FIFA Club World Cup UAE 2010, FIFA.com

World
Final
2010
TP Mazembe matches
Inter Milan matches
World
Sports competitions in Abu Dhabi
21st century in Abu Dhabi